Upper Frankford Township is a township in Cumberland County, Pennsylvania, United States. The population was 2,005 at the 2010 census.

Geography
The township is on the northern side of Cumberland County and is bordered to the north by Perry County; the county line follows the ridgecrest of Blue Mountain, the northern edge of the Cumberland Valley. The eastern border is  Lower Frankford Township, sister township caused by the 1921 split of old Frankford Township. The twin townships' southern border with West Pennsboro Township was created in April of 1795 by the County Court and follows Conodoguinet Creek, a tributary of the Susquehanna River. Lower Mifflin Township is the western border of Upper Frankford Township. The township includes the unincorporated community of Bloserville.

Demographics
As of the census of 2000, there were 1,807 people, 669 households, and 533 families residing in the township.  The population density was 92.5 people per square mile (35.7/km).  There were 719 housing units at an average density of 36.8/sq mi (14.2/km).  The racial makeup of the township was 97.95% White, 0.50% African American, 0.11% Native American, 0.66% Asian, 0.22% from other races, and 0.55% from two or more races. Hispanic or Latino of any race were 0.33% of the population.

There were 669 households, out of which 36.8% had children under the age of 18 living with them, 67.0% were married couples living together, 7.5% had a female householder with no husband present, and 20.2% were non-families. 15.8% of all households were made up of individuals, and 4.8% had someone living alone who was 65 years of age or older.  The average household size was 2.70 and the average family size was 2.99.

In the township the population was spread out, with 25.7% under the age of 18, 7.1% from 18 to 24, 32.8% from 25 to 44, 25.5% from 45 to 64, and 8.9% who were 65 years of age or older.  The median age was 37 years. For every 100 females, there were 102.4 males.  For every 100 females age 18 and over, there were 99.4 males.

The median income for a household in the township was $42,688, and the median income for a family was $45,764. Males had a median income of $34,097 versus $23,160 for females. The per capita income for the township was $16,819.  About 5.1% of families and 6.2% of the population were below the poverty line, including 6.3% of those under age 18 and 8.8% of those age 65 or over.

References

Harrisburg–Carlisle metropolitan statistical area
Townships in Cumberland County, Pennsylvania
Townships in Pennsylvania